A list of films produced in Argentina in 1962:

External links and references
 Argentine films of 1962 at the Internet Movie Database

1962
Films
Argentine